Schache is a surname. Notable people with the surname include:

Anja Schache (born 1977), German foil fencer
Josh Schache (born 1997), Australian rules footballer
Laurence Schache (1967–2002), Australian rules footballer